Borowno  is a village in the administrative district of Gmina Mykanów, within Częstochowa County, Silesian Voivodeship, in southern Poland.

The village has an approximate population of 1,400.

References

Borowno